Paul Robert Archibald Johnston (born 13 December 1988), is an English cricketer.  Johnston is a left-handed batsman who bowls right-arm medium pace.  He was born in Hartlepool, County Durham and educated at Durham University.

He attended Red House School in Norton before going on to Yarm School for college.

Johnston made his first-class debut for Durham UCCE against Derbyshire in 2008 at the County Ground, Derby.  He played a further first-class match that season against Durham, before playing three fixtures in 2009, the last of which came against Warwickshire.  In his five first-class matches, he scored 164 runs at a batting average of 18.22, with a single half century high score of 73.  This came against Warwickshire in his final first-class match.

Johnston joined Cumberland in 2009, making his Minor Counties Championship debut against Lincolnshire and his MCCA Knockout Trophy debut against Cheshire in 2010.

References

External links
Paul Johnston at ESPNcricinfo
Paul Johnston at CricketArchive

1988 births
Cumberland cricketers
Durham MCCU cricketers
English cricketers
Living people
People educated at Red House School
People educated at Yarm School
Sportspeople from Hartlepool
Cricketers from Yorkshire
Cricketers from County Durham

mr:लियाम प्लंकेट
ta:பவுல் ஜான்ஸ்டன்